Supernatural is an American supernatural drama television series, created by Eric Kripke, that follows brothers Sam (Jared Padalecki) and Dean Winchester (Jensen Ackles) as they travel throughout the United States hunting supernatural creatures. The series borrows heavily from folklore and urban legends, and explores mythology and Christian theology, and their main adversaries throughout the series are demons.

The series premiered on September 13, 2005 on The WB. The first season was broadcast on The WB, and following The WB's merger with UPN in September 2006, Supernatural continued to be aired on the new network, The CW. All fifteen seasons are available on DVD in Regions 1, 2, and 4 and are also available on Blu-ray.

Series overview

Episodes

Season 1 (2005–06)

Season 2 (2006–07)

Season 3 (2007–08)

Season 4 (2008–09)

Season 5 (2009–10)

Season 6 (2010–11)

Season 7 (2011–12)

Season 8 (2012–13)

Season 9 (2013–14)

Season 10 (2014–15)

Season 11 (2015–16)

Season 12 (2016–17)

Season 13 (2017–18)

Season 14 (2018–19)

Season 15 (2019–20)

Home video releases

Notes

References

External links 
 
 
 

 
Lists of American drama television series episodes
Lists of American action television series episodes
Lists of American fantasy television series episodes
Lists of American horror-supernatural television series episodes